The Singapore Act 1966 (1966 c. 29) was an Act passed by the Parliament of the United Kingdom that admitted Singapore as a sovereign state into the Commonwealth of Nations with retroactive effect from 9 August 1965, being the date on which Singapore became a sovereign state within the Commonwealth.

See also

Related acts 
 Malaysia Agreement, signed on 9 July 1963 in London
 Independence of Singapore Agreement 1965
 British Nationality Act 1981
 British Overseas Territories Act 2002

Constitutions 
Constitution of Singapore
Constitution of the United Kingdom

References

 The UK Statute Law Database:  Singapore Act 1966 (1966 C 29)
Chronological table of the statutes; HMSO, London. 1993.

Further reading

External links
Historical Sources of Singapore Law: Statutes, Ordinances & Treaties by the National University of Singapore

1966 in law
History of Singapore
United Kingdom Acts of Parliament 1966
Singapore–United Kingdom relations
Singapore and the Commonwealth of Nations
United Kingdom and the Commonwealth of Nations
1966 in international relations
1966 in Singapore